The , known locally as simply the Metropolitan Police Department (MPD), is the prefectural police of Tokyo Metropolis, Japan. Founded in 1874, the TMPD is the largest police force in the world by number of officers, with a staff of more than 40,000 police officers and over 2,800 civilian personnel.

The TMPD is headed by a Superintendent-General, who is appointed by the National Public Safety Commission and approved by the Prime Minister. It manages 10 divisions and 102 stations across the Metropolis.

The TMPD's headquarters are located in Kasumigaseki, Chiyoda, Tokyo. Built in 1980, it is 18 stories tall, and is a large wedge-shaped building with a cylindrical tower. The HQ building is located opposite of Sakurada Gate, so it is also metonymically called "Sakurada Gate".

History

The TMPD was established by Japanese statesman Kawaji Toshiyoshi in 1874. Kawaji, who had helped establish the earlier rasotsu in 1871 following the disestablishment of the Edo period police system, was part of the Iwakura Mission to Europe, where he gathered information on Western policing; he was mostly inspired by the police of France, especially the National Gendarmerie on which the rasotsu were based. On 9 January 1874, the TMPD was established as part of the Home Ministry, with Kawaji serving as its first Superintendent-General.

By the 1880s, the police had developed into a nationwide instrument of government control, and their increasing involvement in political affairs was one of the foundations of the authoritarian state in the Empire of Japan during the first half of the 20th century. By the 1920s and 1930s, police across Japan, including the TMPD, were responsible not only for law enforcement and public security, but also firefighting, labor dispute mediation, censorship, upholding public morality, issuing permits, and government regulation of businesses, construction, and public health.

When Japan surrendered at the end of World War II, the TMPD was placed under Allied control in occupied Japan. Police firefighting duties were also split off to independent fire departments, with the TMPD's Fire Bureau developing into the Tokyo Fire Department in 1948. However, issues concerning manpower and efficiency among smaller and spread out municipalities arose, so in 1954 the amended  was passed, reunifying the police into prefectural divisions under the National Police Agency; as part of the amendment, the TMPD regained jurisdiction over the Tokyo metropolitan area.

Scandals
In 1978, the TMPD was investigated when a uniformed officer killed a female university student inside her residence. In 1997, an officer was caught for making up information in an amphetamine case.

In 2007, the TMPD was under scrutiny when a serving TMPD officer was involved in an incident where he used his official sidearm to shoot a female person to death before he committed suicide.

The TMPD was investigating an incident in the Kamata Police Station in Ota Ward where a police officer committed suicide in February 2014 due to harassment at work. The chief in charge was disciplined.

Organization
The TMPD is under the command of a Superintendent-General and reports directly to the Tokyo Metropolitan Public Safety Commission. The Superintendent-General can be appointed and replaced at any time as long as the prime minister and the TMPSC receives their approval.

Since the TMPD is autonomous, it does not operate under the authority of any Regional Police Bureau.

The TMPD has nine bureaus that report to the Deputy Superintendent General:

The TMPD also has its own academy, the Metropolitan Police Department Academy.

Ranks and insignia
The ranks used in the TMPD have been slightly revised in 2013, changing only the English translation of some of the ranks used by the force.

Otherwise, these ranks are observed throughout its history.

Superintendent-General (four gold rising suns)
Deputy Superintendent-General (not rank, but post of TMPD. gold-wreathed gold emblem with three gold bars)
Senior Commissioner (gold-wreathed gold emblem with three gold bars), formerly Superintendent Supervisor
Commissioner (gold-wreathed gold emblem with two gold bars), formerly Chief Superintendent
Assistant Commissioner (gold-wreathed gold emblem with one gold bar), formerly Senior Superintendent
Superintendent (gold-wreathed silver emblem with three gold bars)
Chief Inspector (gold-wreathed silver emblem with two gold bars), formerly Inspector
Inspector (gold-wreathed silver emblem with one gold bar), formerly Assistant Inspector
Sergeant (silver-wreathed silver emblem with three gold bars)
Senior Police Officer (silver-wreathed silver emblem with two gold bars)
Police Officer (silver-wreathed silver emblem with one gold bar)

Gallery

See also
Security Police (Japan)

Notes

References

External links

Tokyo Metropolitan Police Department 
Tokyo Metropolitan Police Department 

 
Government of Tokyo
Prefectural police of Japan
1874 establishments in Japan
Organizations established in 1874